The last straw is an idiom referring to the Straw that broke the camel's back.

The Last Straw may refer to:
 The Last Straw (1920 film), an American silent western film
 The Last Straw (1987 film), a Canadian comedy film
 The Last Straw (2008 film), an American documentary film of the last live performance of Charles Bukowski reading his poetry
 [[The Last Straw (play)|The Last Staw (play)]], a 1937 comedy play by Edward Percy and Reginald Denham
 The Last Straw (band), an Australian jazz ensemble
 Diary of a Wimpy Kid: The Last Straw'', a novel by American author and cartoonist Jeff Kinney